The Order of the Griffon (German: Greifenorden) was a State Order of the Grand Duchy of Mecklenburg-Schwerin. Established on 15 September 1884, it was created to honour benevolence and outstanding service to the public. In August 1904, the Order of the Griffon was extended to citizens of the Grand Duchy of Mecklenburg-Strelitz, with the rulers of the two grand duchies serving jointly as the Grand Masters of the order.

Classes
The Order of the Griffon was awarded in three classes with six grades:
First class
 Grand Cross
Second class
 Grand Commander's Cross
 Commander's Cross
 Officer's Cross or Honour Cross
Third class
 Knight's Cross with Crown
 Knight's Cross

Appearance
The badge of the order was a red enameled maltese cross, outlined in gold. On the centre of the cross is a disc with a golden griffon surrounded by a gold ring. The Grand Cross badge was worn at the left hip, hanging from a 4 in wide sash that goes over the right shoulder. The Grand Commander's and Commander's Cross badges were worn suspended from the neck on a narrower ribbon. These badges were slightly smaller than the Grand Cross badge, but otherwise identical in appearance. The Honour Cross was smaller still and did not have the gold ring surrounding the griffon in the centre. Finally, the two Knight's Crosses were slightly smaller than the Commander's Cross and worn suspended from a ribbon worn on the left chest.

The star of the order was worn by recipients of the Grand Cross and Grand Commander's Cross on the left chest. The Grand Cross star was a silver 8-armed star with arms of equal length. In the centre of the star is a disc bearing a gold griffon. The disc is surrounded by red enamel with the motto ALTIOR ADVERSIS (Against All Odds), in gold lettering and bordered in gold. The Grand Commander's Cross star was smaller silver 8-armed star with arms alternating between long and short length.

The ribbon of the order was yellow with red edges.

Recipients 

 Duke Adolf Friedrich of Mecklenburg
 Adolphus Frederick VI, Grand Duke of Mecklenburg-Strelitz
 Adolphus Frederick V, Grand Duke of Mecklenburg-Strelitz
 Grand Duke Alexander Mikhailovich of Russia
 Joachim von Amsberg (general)
 Aoki Shūzō
 Prince Axel of Denmark
 Eduard von Below
 Theobald von Bethmann Hollweg
 Moritz von Bissing
 Herbert von Böckmann
 Borwin, Duke of Mecklenburg
 Walther Bronsart von Schellendorff
 Bernhard von Bülow
 Eduard von Capelle
 Christian X of Denmark
 Frederick Francis III, Grand Duke of Mecklenburg-Schwerin
 Frederick Francis IV, Grand Duke of Mecklenburg-Schwerin
 Heinrich von Gossler
 Karl von Graffen
 Duke Henry of Mecklenburg-Schwerin
 Hans Heinrich XV von Hochberg
 Ernst von Hoeppner
 Eberhard von Hofacker
 Adolf Wild von Hohenborn
 Henning von Holtzendorff
 Dietrich von Hülsen-Haeseler
 Oskar von Hutier
 Duke John Albert of Mecklenburg
 Ferdinand Jühlke
 Prince Kitashirakawa Yoshihisa
 Hans von Koester
 Leopold II of Belgium
 Alexander von Linsingen
 Louis Ferdinand, Prince of Prussia
 August von Mackensen
 Helmuth von Moltke the Younger
 Curt von Morgen
 Georg Alexander von Müller
 Duke Paul Frederick of Mecklenburg (1882–1904)
 Duke Paul Frederick of Mecklenburg
 Karl von Plettenberg
 Hugo von Pohl
 Frederick Ponsonby, 1st Baron Sysonby
 Reinhard Scheer
 Eberhard Graf von Schmettow
 Gustav von Senden-Bibran
 Grand Duke Sergei Mikhailovich of Russia
 Hermann von Stengel
 Hermann von Strantz
 Otto von Stülpnagel
 Alfred von Tirpitz
 Adolf von Trotha
 Karl von Wedel
 Arthur Zimmermann

Sources

References

Griffon
Orders, decorations, and medals of Mecklenburg-Strelitz